William L. Wearly (December 5, 1915 – April 30, 2010) was chief executive officer and chairman of Ingersoll-Rand Co. and chief executive officer and president of Joy Global. Wearly was elected to the National Academy of Engineering in 1990 "for leadership in the development and manufacture of equipment contributing to safety and productivity in mining and in related industries".

References 

1915 births
2010 deaths
American engineers
American businesspeople
Members of the United States National Academy of Engineering